Martin Municipal Airport  is a city-owned, public-use airport located one nautical mile (2 km) southeast of the central business district of Martin, a city in Bennett County, South Dakota, United States. It is included in the National Plan of Integrated Airport Systems for 2011–2015, which categorized it as a general aviation facility.

Facilities and aircraft 
Martin Municipal Airport covers an area of 183 acres (74 ha) at an elevation of 3,295 feet (1,004 m) above mean sea level. It has one runway designated 14/32 with an asphalt surface measuring 3,699 by 60 feet (1,127 x 18 m).

For the 12-month period ending July 2, 2012, the airport had 660 general aviation aircraft operations, an average of 55 per month. At that time there were five aircraft based at this airport: 80% single-engine and 20% helicopter.

References

External links 
 Martin Municipal Airport (9V6) at SDDOT Airport Directory
 Aerial image as of August 1991 from USGS The National Map
 
 

Airports in South Dakota
Transportation in Bennett County, South Dakota